The South Derbyshire Football Association was the third oldest football association in the world, after the FA and Sheffield FA.  In 1871 it consisted of eleven clubs and used the Sheffield Rules.

References

County football associations
Football in Derbyshire
Sports organizations established in 1871
1871 establishments in England